Fellabær is a town in Eastern Iceland, located right across Lagarfljót from Egilsstaðir.

The bridge is a part of the Ring Road. The municipality of Fljótsdalshérað provides free shuttle services between the two towns. Amenities in the town include a bookshop with a cafe, an Olís gas station and several places for accommodation.

References 

Populated places in Eastern Region (Iceland)